Carol Janet Brown Janeway (1 February 1944 – 3 August 2015) was a Scottish-American editor and literary translator into English. She is best known for her translation of Bernhard Schlink's The Reader.

Biography
Carol Janet Brown was born in Edinburgh, Scotland. Her father Robin Brown was a chartered accountant, while her mother was a director of the Ranfurly Library, specialising in the translation of medieval French and German lyrics. She attended St George's School, Edinburgh and went on to study modern and medieval languages at Girton College, Cambridge. After graduating with a first-class degree, she worked at John Farquharson, a literary agency in London.

In 1970 she moved to New York, where she joined the publisher Alfred A. Knopf. She became a senior editor, responsible for purchasing publishing rights from international publishers, and began her parallel career in literary translation, mainly from German.

Among the authors Janeway edited was George MacDonald Fraser. She also published Heinrich Böll, Imre Kertész, Thomas Mann, José Donoso, Ivan Klima, Yukio Mishima, Elsa Morante, Robert Musil and Patrick Süskind.

An early translation by Janeway was Das Boot by Lothar-Günther Buchheim. Her translations of The Reader by Bernhard Schlink and Embers by Sandor Marai were lauded.

Personal life
Her first marriage to William H. Janeway was dissolved. Later, she married Erwin Glikes, who died in 1994.

Death
She died of cancer on 3 August 2015, aged 71, in New York City.

Selected translations

From German
 My Prizes, by Thomas Bernhard
 The Reader, by Bernhard Schlink
 Summer Lies, by Bernhard Schlink
 Embers, by Sándor Márai
 Crime, by Ferdinand von Schirach
 Guilt, by Ferdinand von Schirach
 Measuring the World, by Daniel Kehlmann
 Fame, by Daniel Kehlmann
 F, by Daniel Kehlmann
 Me and Kaminski, by Daniel Kehlmann
Fragments: Memories of a Wartime Childhood, by Binjamin Wilkomirski

From Yiddish
 Yosl Rakover Talks to God, by Zvi Kolitz.

From Dutch
 The Storm, by Margriet de Moor

From French
 Desolation, by Yasmina Reza
 Dawn Dusk or Night: My Year With Nicolas Sarkozy, by Yasmina Reza

Awards
 2013 Friedrich Ulfers Prize for translations of German literature.
 2014 Ottaway Award for the Promotion of International Literature.

References

Further reading
 Translation of Zvi Kolitz's Yosl Rakover Talks to God, templebethelsoc.org
 

1944 births
2015 deaths
People educated at St George's School, Edinburgh
American editors
American women editors
Scottish editors
Scottish women editors
Scottish translators
German–English translators
Literary translators
Alumni of Girton College, Cambridge
Writers from Edinburgh
Deaths from cancer in New York (state)
20th-century American translators
20th-century American women writers
21st-century American women